Ninja Gaiden is a side-scrolling, hack & slash, platform-action video game developed by SIMS and released by Sega for the Master System in 1992, with license from Tecmo.

This video game stars Ryu Hayabusa and is part of the Ninja Gaiden series, although it features a plot not connected to any of the other Ninja Gaiden games. Due to the discontinued support of the console in Japan and North America, the game was only released in Europe, Australia and other PAL territories, bearing the Ninja Gaiden label instead of the Shadow Warriors one that was usually used for the series by the time in PAL releases.

Gameplay

The game features similar gameplay mechanics to the previous NES Ninja Gaiden games. Movements, attacks and jumps are performed in the same mood, and special ninja attacks are cast as usually, by pressing Up and Attack simultaneously. This version replaced some features from the NES games with new abilities, such as the ability to climb hand-over-hand or cling to walls in the NES games being replaced by the new wall-to-wall jumping ability in the Master System game, similar to the later 2004 Xbox game and later 3D Ninja Gaiden games after that.

Plot
Ryu Hayabusa is a member of the Dragon Ninja clan, who have protected Japan for generations. One day he is away from home, he receives a message that the Dragon Village, home of the Dragon clan, has been brutally massacred. He rushes home finding that all but one of the village members have been killed. The last survivor of the village tells Ryu with his dying breath that the sacred Bushido scroll has been stolen. The Bushido is a scroll of power so strong that its owner can control the world. As the last Ninja of the Dragon clan, the fate of the world is in its hands. He embarks on a trip to regain the Sacred Scroll of Bushido from the hands of the evil Shogun of Darkness and his minions. Some of the minions Ryu must he must first take on and defeat are the Sumo Wrestler, Yakuza Oyabun, Tsutenkaku Samurai, Jetpack Soldier, Ice Monster, and the Stone Golem.

There are two versions of the game that exist; the first version tells the story through the eyes of Ryu himself, explaining his experiences in great detail and the second version is narrated from an outside source, but some details of the plot are not explained as much. Furthermore, certain dialogue and names vary between the two versions as well.

Reception

Ninja Gaiden for the Master System was critically acclaimed upon release. Sega Force reviewed the game and gave it a score of 90%. The main reviewer Mat Yeo states that Ryu "can jump, fire, use extra weapons and perform a handy trick to reach high ledges. Stand under the ledge, press jump and up to flip Ryu onto it." He stated that he was "well impressed with this game. I loved Ninja Gaiden on the Game Gear and this is a thousand times better!" He concluded that, with "loads of levels, tough villains and a challenging mission to complete, it should satisfy even those who’re sick to death of platform games." Another reviewer Chris Knight stated that the game is "great to look at, the music and in-game effects are nicely atmospheric, and above all, the controls work a treat."

By Summer till Fall 1992, the game was among the top 10 successful selling Master system games at the time. Zero magazine reviewed it and gave a 90% score. The reviewer Patrick McCarthy stated that there are many "enemies to hack and slash," the "graphics are pretty smart," that "the animation and control over the main character are both very good," the player "can leap about from platform to platform," and "there are loads of different special moves" in the game. He concluded that the game "is to the Master System what The Revenge of Shinobi is to the Mega Drive. I love it." One Mean Machines reviewer Rob, stated that the game "boasts excellent graphics," compared its animation quality to Prince of Persia, and praised the responsive controls, "range of weapons and moves" that add replayability, and "large size" of the game. The other reviewer, Rich, stated that the "graphics are excellent" and rival the Mega Drive's visuals, and praised the smooth scrolling, "fast and hectic pace" of the game, and selection of weapons, concluding that it is a "great slash 'em up" for the Master System. The magazine gave the game an overall 83% score.

Sega Master Force reviewed the game in its September 1993 issue, which gave it a score of 90%. The magazine states that "Ryu's death-dealing begins in a forest, where he scales trees, avoids spiked pits and dodges bad ninjas' throwing stars. Defeating an end-of-level sumo, later stages take place against the Tokyo skyline, in a cave, across a frozen landscape and at a temple." It then states that "Bushido scrolls restore energy and give weapons, but it's the controls and your use of them which make this game. Ryu moves like a well-oiled machine and responds quickly." It concludes that "Ninja Gaiden’s enough to satisfy even those who've tired of the platform genre." The game was later reviewed by Defunct Games in 2005. The reviewer Cyril Lachel described it as "easily one of the best action games you can buy for your Master System" and gave it an overall A− rating.

References

External links

1992 video games
Europe-exclusive video games
Ninja Gaiden games
Master System games
Master System-only games
Side-scrolling beat 'em ups
Single-player video games
Video games set in Japan
SIMS Co., Ltd. games
Sega video games
Video games developed in Japan